Siddiqur Rahman is a Bangladesh Nationalist Party politician and the former Member of Parliament of Bakerganj-4 and Bhola-2.

Career
Rahman was elected to parliament from Barisal-4 (Bakerganj-4) as a Bangladesh Nationalist Party candidate in 1979. was elected to parliament from Bhola-2 as a Jatiya Party candidate in 1988.

References

Bangladesh Nationalist Party politicians
Living people
2nd Jatiya Sangsad members
Year of birth missing (living people)
4th Jatiya Sangsad members
Jatiya Party (Ershad) politicians